Kolbino is a rural locality (a selo) and the administrative center of Kolbinskoye Rural Settlement, Repyovsky District, Voronezh Oblast, Russia. The population was 635 as of 2010. There are 5 streets.

Geography 
Kolbino is located 23 km east of Repyovka (the district's administrative centre) by road. Prilepy is the nearest rural locality.

References 

Rural localities in Repyovsky District